The Turkmen Soviet Encyclopedia was the first encyclopedia in the Turkmen language (Cyrillic alphabet), published in Ashkhabad in ten volumes from 1974 to 1989.

A supplementary volume, Turkmen SSR, was published in both Turkmen (1983) and Russian (1984).

Main redactors: Pygam Azimov (v1), Nury Atamamedov (v2-10).

References

Turkmen Soviet Socialist Republic
1974 non-fiction books
20th-century encyclopedias
Turkmen encyclopedias
National Soviet encyclopedias